The 2018–19 Los Angeles Kings season was the 52nd season (51st season of play) for the National Hockey League franchise that was established on June 5, 1967. On March 18, 2019, the Kings were eliminated from playoff contention, and missed the playoffs for the third time in five seasons.

Standings

Schedule and results

Preseason
The preseason schedule was published on June 20, 2018.

Regular season
The regular season schedule was released on June 21, 2018.

Player statistics
As of April 6, 2019

Skaters

Goaltenders 

†Denotes player spent time with another team before joining the Kings. Stats reflect time with the Kings only.
‡Denotes player was traded mid-season. Stats reflect time with the Kings only.
Bold/italics denotes franchise record.

Transactions
The Kings have been involved in the following transactions during the 2018–19 season.

Trades

Free agents

Waivers

Contract terminations

Retirement

Signings

Draft picks

Below are the Los Angeles Kings' selections at the 2018 NHL Entry Draft, which was held on June 22 and 23, 2018, at the American Airlines Center in Dallas, Texas.

Notes:
 The New York Islanders' sixth-round pick went to the Los Angeles Kings as the result of a trade on June 24, 2017, that sent a sixth-round pick in 2017 to New York in exchange for this pick.

References

Los Angeles Kings seasons
Los Angeles Kings
Kings
Kings
Kings
Kings